The Town of Deer Trail is a Statutory Town located in eastern Arapahoe County, Colorado, United States. The town population was 1,068 at the 2020 United States Census, a +95.60% increase since the 2010 United States Census. Deer Trail is a part of the Denver–Aurora–Lakewood, CO Metropolitan Statistical Area and the Front Range Urban Corridor.

History
Deer Trail was founded when the Kansas Pacific Railway built a station in what is now Deer Trail in 1870. The town was platted by the railway in 1875 and soon became a shipping point for grain, livestock, and eggs. By the late 1920s Deer Trail grew into a town larger than it is today with two banks, five grocery stores, and three hotels. The Great Depression of the 1930s took a major toll on the town's economy, and a further blow took place in June 1965 when a devastating flood destroyed or severely damaged the businesses along main street. Many of these buildings were never rebuilt.  Deer Trail hosted the first rodeo exhibition on July 4, 1869.

In 2013, the town was considering an ordinance that would create drone hunting licenses and offer bounties for unmanned aerial vehicles.

Geography
Deer Trail is located at  (39.615888, -104.042967).

At the 2020 United States Census, the town had a total area of  including  of water.

Demographics

As of the census of 2000, there were 598 people, 247 households, and 162 families residing in the town. The racial makeup of the town was 96.32% White, 0.33% African American, 0.17% Native American, 0.84% Asian, 0.84% from other races, and 1.51% from two or more races. Hispanic or Latino of any race were 2.51% of the population.

There were 247 households, out of which 33.6% had children under the age of 18 living with them, 53.8% were married couples living together, 8.9% had a female householder with no husband present, and 34.4% were non-families. 30.8% of all households were made up of individuals, and 15.4% had someone living alone who was 65 years of age or older.  The average household size was 2.42 and the average family size was 3.06.

In the town, the population was spread out, with 28.4% under the age of 18, 8.2% from 18 to 24, 28.1% from 25 to 44, 19.2% from 45 to 64, and 16.1% who were 65 years of age or older.  The median age was 35 years. For every 100 females, there were 105.5 males.  For every 100 females age 18 and over, there were 99.1 males.

The median income for a household in the town was $30,481, and the median income for a family was $35,357. Males had a median income of $31,324 versus $21,750 for females. The per capita income for the town was $16,000.  About 3.0% of families and 5.5% of the population were below the poverty line, including 1.9% of those under age 18 and 6.4% of those age 65 or over.

Education
Deer Trail is served by Deer Trail School District 26J. Deer Trail School District 26J has one elementary school, one middle school and one high school. The three schools are Deer Trail Elementary School, Deer Trail Middle School and Deer Trail High School.  The school mascot is the Eagles.

See also

Colorado
Bibliography of Colorado
Index of Colorado-related articles
Outline of Colorado
List of counties in Colorado
List of municipalities in Colorado
List of places in Colorado
List of statistical areas in Colorado
Front Range Urban Corridor
North Central Colorado Urban Area
Denver-Aurora, CO Combined Statistical Area
Denver-Aurora-Lakewood, CO Metropolitan Statistical Area

References

External links

Town of Deer Trail
CDOT map of the Town of Deer Trail

Towns in Arapahoe County, Colorado
Towns in Colorado
Denver metropolitan area